Hiryū , meaning "Flying Dragon" may refer to:

Japanese aircraft carrier Hiryū
Mitsubishi Ki-67 Hiryū, Japanese Army bomber
Strider Hiryu, a ninja-like video game character
Flying Dragon, a video game series known as Hiryu no Ken in Japan
Trademark of Yomeishu that is the most traditional Japanese medical liquor. The trademark was given by the shōgun Ieyasu Tokugawa.

See also
 Flying Dragon (disambiguation)